Charles Alexander Allard (November 19, 1919August 11, 1991) was a Canadian surgeon, entrepreneur, and broadcaster, who set up the Canadian radio station CHQT and Edmonton's independent television station CITV-TV, and was also the founder of the Bank of Alberta, Allarcom, and the Edmonton Oilers. He was also the fellow of the Royal College of Surgeons of Canada, chief of staff at the Edmonton General Hospital, and posthumously inducted in the CAB Hall of Fame in 1996.

Life
Charles Allard was born in Edmonton, Alberta, in 1919, and graduated from high school in Edmonton. He received his medical degree from the University of Alberta in 1943, and went on to complete his postgraduate studies in surgery at the Montreal General Hospital; Lahey Clinic, Boston; Royal Victoria Hospital, Montreal; and Children's Memorial Hospital of Montreal. He was appointed the chief of staff of the Edmonton General Hospital.

Allard passed away in Edmonton, in 1991 at the age of 72.

Enterprises
Allard has had a diverse range of entrepreneurial efforts spanning medicine, broadcasting, banking, and sports and entertainment.

In 1965, Allard founded the Edmonton radio station CHQT, and western Canada's first independent TV station, CITV-TV, in 1973.  He co-founded Paris Investments, which was later renamed Allarco Developments, and became one of the largest real-estate companies in Canada.  He was the founder, chairman of the board, and director of Alberta Gas and Chemicals.  Dr. Allard was the founder, chairman of the board, and director of International Jet Air.  He was one of the founders of Bank of Alberta, which went on to become the Canadian Western Bank.  He consolidated his media interests into Allarcom which was sold to Western International Communications in 1991.

In 1971, he founded the hockey team, the Edmonton Oilers, then a participant in the World Hockey Association, with notable players that included Wayne Gretzky.

Honours and awards
Allard was the recipient of multiple honours, including:
 Canadian Business Hall of Fame (inducted 1995)
Canadian Association of Broadcasters Broadcast Hall of Fame (inducted 1996)

References

1919 births
1991 deaths
20th-century surgeons
Businesspeople from Edmonton
Canadian mass media owners
Canadian surgeons
Edmonton Oilers executives